Phalonidia albertae is a species of moth of the family Tortricidae. It is found in North America, where it has been recorded from Alberta and Maryland.

Adults have been recorded on wing from April to September.

References

Moths described in 1997
Phalonidia